Matthias Maute (born 1963) is a virtuoso recorder player and composer.

Maute was born in Ebingen, Germany and studied in Freiburg and Utrecht with Baldrick Deerenberg and Marion Verbruggen. In 1990 he won first prize in the soloist category of the competition Musica Antiqua Bruges, Belgium. He subsequently won the Dutch Impressariat Chamber Music Competition.

He has played with several chamber music groups, including REBEL Baroque Orchestra, and has made a number of recordings. He is the artistic director of Ensemble Caprice, which includes his wife and duo partner, Sophie Lariviere, who plays the recorder and traverso flute.

He is a professor at McGill University in Montreal and a member of Vox Saeculorum, a society of composers working in early historical styles.

External links
 
 

1963 births
Living people
German composers
Canadian recorder players
German recorder players
Vox Saeculorum